Cara Black and Leander Paes were the defending champions, but were defeated by Carly Gullickson and Travis Parrott in the final 2–6, 4–6.

Seeds

Draw

Finals

Top half

Bottom half

External links 
 Main Draw
2009 US Open – Doubles draws and results at the International Tennis Federation

Mixed Doubles
US Open (tennis) by year – Mixed doubles